The Diocese of Magadan and Sinegorye is an eparchy of the Russian Orthodox Church. The Eparchy Cathedral is the Holy Trinity Cathedral in Magadan.

History
The Magadan Diocese was part of the Irkutsk diocese until 1831, when most of it became part of Kamchatka. In 1858, the land was divided into Magadan and the Yakut Kamchatka dioceses, and in 1900, the territory of the latter was transferred to the newly established Diocese of Vladivostok.

In a decision blessed by Patriarch Tikhon on September 11, 1912, the Supreme Church Authority created an independent Department of Kamchatka. The first parish was opened in 1989.

Magadan diocese, which includes Magadan Oblast and Chukotka Autonomous District, was formed by the Holy Synod of the Russian Orthodox Church on February 26,1961.

On July 19, 1999, two further parishes, Anadyr and Chukotka, were added; these are located in the Chukotka Autonomous District.

As of 2012, the diocese had 12 parishes served by 24 clerics.

References 

Eparchies of the Russian Orthodox Church